Jacques Barbel (c. 1670 – 30 July 1740) was a French soldier in Canada who stayed in the country and became a part of the history of Quebec. His daughter, Marie-Anne Barbel and her husband, Louis Fornel became successful merchants as well.

Barbel was an active participant in the region from 1687. He at various times was a judge, a royal notary and an important legal practitioner. He was a seigneur and, for a time, acted as secretary to the Intendant of New France, Michel Bégon de la Picardière.

References
 
 Genealogie Quebec (French)

1670 births
1740 deaths
People of New France